Catwoman: Hunted is a 2022 American animated superhero film based on the DC Comics character Catwoman by Bill Finger and Bob Kane, and produced by Warner Bros. Animation for DC Entertainment. It was released on February 8, 2022, by Warner Bros. Home Entertainment. It is the 44th installment in the DC Universe Animated Original Movies (DCUAOM) line. The film is directed by Shinsuke Terasawa from a script by Greg Weisman. It stars the voices of Elizabeth Gillies, Stephanie Beatriz, Jonathan Banks, Steve Blum, Lauren Cohan, Zehra Fazal, Jonathan Frakes, Kirby Howell-Baptiste, Kelly Hu, Andrew Kishino, Eric Lopez, Jacqueline Obradors, and Ron Yuan. OLM, a Japanese studio behind the Pokémon anime series, provided their animation services for the film with their Team Inoue. The film follows Catwoman as she attempts to steal a priceless jewel. The heist puts her squarely in the crosshairs of both a powerful consortium of criminals and villains and the ever-resourceful Interpol as well as Batwoman. 

It was stated by Weisman to be "adjacent" to his animated series Young Justice, meaning that some version of the film's events occurred in the universe of the cartoon but not necessarily with all details exactly the same.

Plot
Catwoman infiltrates a gangster costume party hosted by Barbara Minerva in Spain, which is also attended by Gotham City mobster Black Mask who is seeking to join Leviathan, the crime cartel which Minerva leads. As his entrance fee, Black Mask delivers the Cat's Eye Emerald. Catwoman promptly steals the gem and shakes off most of the pursuing gangsters in a furious car chase. Just then, Batwoman blocks her way, causing Catwoman to crash her car, and Minerva's aide Tobias Whale recovers the emerald. In revenge for this theft, Minerva has Catwoman marked for liquidation.

Catwoman regains consciousness aboard a jet plane bound for Shanghai in the custody of Batwoman and Interpol agents Julia Pennyworth and King Faraday. Batwoman and the agents explain that the emerald was rigged as a tracking beacon to find and take down Leviathan's entire leadership cadre in one strike. In exchange for Catwoman's cooperation in this case, they offer her complete amnesty for her past crimes. Catwoman agrees, but in between she makes telephonic contact with her friend Holly asking about the status of a group of girls in her care. After the exact location is found, Catwoman and Batwoman infiltrate the meeting place, but are forced to battle hired assassins Cheshire and Nosferata which results in the Leviathan bosses Black Mask, Doctor Tzin-Tzin, Mister Yakuza, La Dama, her demonic auxiliaries Abbadon and Morax, and Moxie Mannheim joining the fight. The cartel bosses and Whale are defeated and arrested, but Minerva manages to get away. Catwoman receives her pardon and walks away, seemingly shrugging off the threat Minerva still poses to her life.

Some time later, Catwoman is still active, but constantly harried by ninjas from the League of Assassins sent by Minerva's associate Talia al Ghul, Leviathan's true leader. After Batwoman helps her defeat the latest assassin detachment in Paris, Minverva unleashes Solomon Grundy on them. Batwoman is knocked out, but Catwoman defeats Grundy by stuffing his mouth with lit dynamite sticks from a construction site. Forced to take matters into her own hands, Minerva appears before Catwoman, changes into her werecheetah form, and chases after her quarry. Catwoman retreats onto the boom of a construction crane, where she taunts Cheetah by revealing that she was responsible for recently breaking up one of Leviathan's human trafficking operations in Sochi, freeing a group of girls slated for underage prostitution and taking them under her care. When Cheetah attacks, Catwoman outdodges her and strangles her into submission. A subsequent lightning strike throws Cheetah off the crane and into the steel bars of a reinforced concrete column, impaling her, although her superhuman physiology enables her to survive.

As Interpol takes Cheetah and Grundy into custody, Catwoman takes her leave after warning Faraday that Leviathan is far from being finished and revealing that she had deliberately targeted the cartel with the theft of the Cat's Eye Emerald, in vengeance for the trafficked girls' plight. After secretly nabbing the jewel from the jet's safe as well, she next travels to London to "pick up a few things at the Tower".

Voice cast
 Elizabeth Gillies as Catwoman / Selina Kyle
 Stephanie Beatriz as Batwoman / Kate Kane
 Kirby Howell-Baptiste as Cheetah / Barbara Minerva
 Zehra Fazal as Talia al Ghul, Nosferata, Interpol Commando 1
 Steve Blum as Solomon Grundy, Abaddon, Pilot
 Lauren Cohan as Julia Pennyworth
 Jonathan Banks as Black Mask / Roman Sionis
 Keith David as Tobias Whale, Morax
 Jonathan Frakes as King Faraday, Boss Moxie
 Kelly Hu as Cheshire / Jade Nguyen
 Andrew Kishino as Mr. Yakuza (Oyabun Noguri), Leviathan Guard 2, Domino 6
 Eric Lopez as Domino 1, Leviathan Guard 3, Valet 1
 Jacqueline Obradors as La Dama (Amparo Cardenas)
 Ron Yuan as Doctor Tzin-Tzin, Interpol Commando 2

Production
The film was announced on August 17, 2021, alongside its voice cast. The film had an anime-style production with Shinsuke Terasawa directing and written by Greg Weisman while Ethan Spaulding is attached as producer, along with Colin A.B.V. Lewis, who worked on The Simpsons, and Sam Register, who produced multiple DC Animated projects, as executive producers. An exclusive sneak peak was released during the DC FanDome's 2021 Warner Bros. Animation panel.

Release
Catwoman: Hunted was released on Ultra HD Blu-ray, Blu-ray and DVD in the US and Canada on February 8, 2022.

Reception 
The review aggregator Rotten Tomatoes reported an approval rating of 78% based on 5 reviews, with an average rating of 6.0/10. 

Jesse Schedeen of IGN gave the film 9 out of 10 stars, saying "Catwoman: Hunted is a fun, anime-flavored superhero adventure that ranks among the best of the DC Universe Movies line".

Dillon Gonzales, writing for Geek Vibes Nation, gave the film a positive review, saying "Catwoman: Hunted marks a very welcome step from the DCAU towards putting a spotlight on women who are not called Wonder Woman. The effort is not the most vital, but it is one that embraces its sleek sense of fun that makes it very transfixing. The vocal performances capture the allure of these characters quite deftly".

The film earned $398,656 from domestic Blu-ray sales.

Notes

References

External links
 
 Catwoman: Hunted at The World's Finest
 

2022 films
2022 animated films
2022 crime action films
2022 direct-to-video films
2020s American animated films
2020s direct-to-video animated superhero films
2020s English-language films
American animated action films
American crime action films
Animated crime films
Animated films set in Paris
Anime-influenced Western animation
Catwoman in other media
DC Universe Animated Original Movies
Films scored by Yutaka Yamada
Films set in Shanghai
Films set in Spain